The 2005–06 ABA season was the fifth season of the American Basketball Association. The regular season began in November 2005 and concluded with the championship game in March against the Rochester Razorsharks and the Southern California Legends. The Razorsharks won the game, 117-114, to claim their first ABA title.

Regular Season Standings

Playoff Results

Wild card round 
Rochester Razorsharks (1) received bye to Bracket One Quarterfinal
Indiana Alley Cats (2) received bye to Bracket Two Quarterfinal
San Jose Skyrockets (3) received bye to Bracket One Quarterfinal
SoCal Legends (4) received bye to Bracket Two Quarterfinal
Maryland Nighthawks (5) received bye to Bracket Two Quarterfinal
Pittsburgh Xplosion (6) received bye to Bracket One Quarterfinal
Atlanta Vision (7) received bye to Bracket One Quarterfinal
Harlem Strong Dogs (8) received bye to Bracket Two Quarterfinal
Newark Express (9) received bye to Bracket One Quarterfinal
Bellingham Slam (10) defeated Tacoma Navigators (22) 134-116
Toledo Ice (11) defeated Detroit Wheels (21) 132-130
Montreal Matrix (12) defeated Ohio Aviators (23) 140-83
Strong Island Sound (13) defeated Birmingham Magicians (19) 97-95
Beijing Aoshen Olympian (14) defeated Fresno Heatwave (20) 134-82
Buffalo Rapids (15) defeated Boston Frenzy (16) 133-88
Los Angeles Aftershock (18) defeated Orange County Buzz (17) 91-86

References

American Basketball Association (2000–present) seasons
ABA